"Brand New Man" is a song recorded by American country music duo Brooks & Dunn, written by Kix Brooks, Don Cook and Ronnie Dunn. It was released in June 1991 as their debut single, and was served as the first single and title track from their debut album of the same name, and their first Number One single on the country charts, thus making them only the second country music band in history to have its debut single reach Number One on the Billboard Hot Country Singles & Tracks chart (behind Diamond Rio's "Meet in the Middle" from three months earlier).

In 2019, Brooks & Dunn re-recorded "Brand New Man" with American country music singer Luke Combs for their album, Reboot. This version peaked at number 42 on the Billboard Country Airplay chart, and at number 30 on the Billboard Hot Country Songs chart.

Content
The song's narrator is telling his lover that he is a "brand new man" thanks to her.

Cover versions
Country music singer Keith Urban covered the song from The Last Rodeo Tour

Music video
The music video for this song features Brooks & Dunn singing the song at a concert. Scenes also feature the duo singing and playing guitar in a desert, and them drinking at local bars. The video was directed by Michael Merriman. Both this and the video for "My Next Broken Heart," were shot in the same Texas town, featured the same actress, and filmed at the same time.

Chart positions
"Brand New Man" debuted on the U.S. Billboard Hot Country Singles & Tracks for the week of June 22, 1991.

Year-end charts

References

1991 songs
1991 debut singles
2019 singles
Brooks & Dunn songs
Luke Combs songs
Vocal collaborations
Songs written by Kix Brooks
Songs written by Don Cook
Songs written by Ronnie Dunn
Song recordings produced by Scott Hendricks
Song recordings produced by Don Cook
Arista Nashville singles